Pixie and Dixie and Mr. Jinks is a Hanna-Barbera cartoon television series that featured as a regular segment of the television series The Huckleberry Hound Show from 1958 to 1961.

Plot
The cartoon series stars two mice, the bow-tied Pixie (voiced by Don Messick) and the vested Dixie (voiced by Daws Butler), and Mr. Jinks the cat (also voiced by Butler  impersonating Marlon Brando) who is always outfoxed by the mice, causing him to utter his trademark line "I hates those meeces to pieces!"  The show's plot itself and its characters followed the same basic concept as Tom and Jerry, the film series Hanna-Barbera had developed for MGM; because Hanna-Barbera were constrained by the smaller budgets for television, Pixie and Dixie and Mr. Jinks emphasized verbal humor to compensate for the more limited animation compared to the more physical comedy used by the mostly mute Tom and Jerry shorts.

Cast
 Don Messick as Pixie 
 Daws Butler as Dixie and Mr. Jinks

Episodes

Season 1 (1958–59)

Season 2 (1959–60)

Season 3 (1960–61)

Home media
In 1989, Hanna-Barbera Home Video released some episodes on the VHS release entitled "Pixie and Dixie: Love Those Meeces to Pieces".

The episodes "King Size Surprise", "Judo Jack", and "Jinks Jr." were released on another VHS tape by Hanna-Barbera Home Video in 1990.

On November 15, 2005, Warner Home Video released The Huckleberry Hound Show–Vol 1. Some cartoons are available on this DVD release.

The "Heavens To Jinksy" short is available on the Cartoon Network Cartoon Crack Ups VHS and DVD.

Pixie and Dixie and Mr. Jinks in other languages
 Brazilian Portuguese: Plic e Ploc e Chuvisco
 Bulgarian: Пикси, Дикси и мистър Джинкс
 Czech: Pišta a Fišta (Mr. Jinks is called Fous, meaning Whiskers)
 French: Pixie, Dixie et Jules
 German: Pixie und Dixie
 Hungarian: Inci, Finci és Kandúr Bandi
 Italian: Pixie e Dixie
 Japanese: チュースケとチュータ (Chuusuke to Chuuta), (Mr. Jinks is called both Jinks and Doraneko)
 Polish: Pixie, Dixie i Pan Jinks
 Serbian: Piksi i Diksi
 Spanish: Pixie, Dixie y el Gato Jinks. The characters were dubbed in an unusual way, each one speaking Spanish with a distinct accent. Mr. Jinks had a strong Southern Spanish (Andalusian) accent, Dixie was Cuban and Pixie was Mexican.
 Turkish: Bıcır, Gıcır & Tırmık

Other appearances
 Pixie and Dixie made a non-speaking cameo appearance in the Christmas special Casper's First Christmas as brother and sister.
 Pixie and Dixie and Mr. Jinks appeared in the Christmas special Yogi Bear's All Star Comedy Christmas Caper.
 Pixie and Dixie and Mr. Jinks appeared in The Yogi Bear Show episode "Yogi's Birthday Party."
 Pixie and Dixie and Mr. Jinks made non-speaking cameos and in the opening title of Yogi's Gang.
 Pixie, Dixie and Mr. Jinks were featured in the Laff-A-Lympics as members of the Yogi Yahooeys.
 Pixie and Dixie and Mr. Jinks appeared in some episodes of Yogi's Treasure Hunt.
 Pixie and Dixie appeared in the "Fender Bender 500" segment of Wake, Rattle, and Roll driving a cheese-modeled monster truck called the Chedder Shredder. While Pixie was still voiced by Don Messick, Dixie was voiced by Patric Zimmerman.
 In Scooby-Doo, Where Are You!, In episode of "Foul Play in Funland". When Shaggy and Scooby were in the Hall of Mirrors, Scooby sees a giant reflection of a mouse that is reminiscent of Pixie and Dixie in a mirror, shortly before Charlie the Funland Robot catches them.
 Pixie and Dixie were going to have a cameo in Who Framed Roger Rabbit, but were later dropped for unknown reasons.
 In Yo Yogi!, Pixie and Dixie (voiced again by Don Messick and Patric Zimmerman) live in a cheese store run by Mr. Jinks (voiced by Greg Burson). In "Of Meece and Men," Dick Dastardly and Muttley teach Mr. Jinks to act tough in order to get the two mice out of his cheese store causing the L.A.F. Squad to intervene.
 Pixie, Dixie and Mr. Jinks (all voiced by Jeff Bergman) appeared in the Cartoon Network/Boomerang short "Harasscat". Pixie and Dixie get a restraining order on Jinks for stalking.
 Cartoon Network had a bumper with Pixie, Dixie, and Mr. Jinks spoofing The Shining which was a Halloween eyecatch.
 In 1961, Mr. Jinks served as the UK mascot of Coco Pops.
 Pixie and Dixie make cameos in the Harvey Birdman, Attorney at Law episodes "Shazzan", "Juror in Court" and "The Death of Harvey".
 The series was parodied in the 1998–2001 Hungarian gag dub Narancs, Tetves és Dugó.
 Pixie, Dixie and Mr. Jinks appeared in DC Comics Deathstroke/Yogi Bear Special #1 as captured animals alongside other Hanna-Barbera characters.
 Pixie, Dixie and Mr. Jinks appeared in Jellystone! with Mr. Jinks voiced again by Jeff Bergman and Pixie voiced by Jenny Lorenzo. Dixie is a girl in this series and yet to speak. Mr. Jinks works as Mayor Huckleberry Hound's personal assistant and the mice are mentioned to own a candy store..

See also

 List of The Huckleberry Hound Show episodes
 List of works produced by Hanna-Barbera
 List of Hanna-Barbera characters

References

External links 
 Pixie and Dixie at Don Markstein's Toonopedia. Archived from the original on September 4, 2015.
 Pixie and Dixie and Mr. Jinks at the Big Cartoon Database
  The Cartoon Scrapbook – Profile on Pixie & Dixie and Mr. Jinks

1958 American television series debuts
1961 American television series endings
1950s American animated television series
1960s American animated television series
American children's animated comedy television series
Animated television series about cats
Animated television series about mice and rats
English-language television shows
Hanna-Barbera characters
Television series by Hanna-Barbera
Yogi Bear characters
Huckleberry Hound television series
Fictional rivalries
Male characters in animation